Stephen Silas (born August 6, 1973) is an American basketball coach who is the head coach for the Houston Rockets of the National Basketball Association (NBA). He is the son of NBA star player and head coach Paul Silas.

He worked under his father at the Charlotte Hornets from 2000 to 2002, New Orleans Hornets from 2002 to 2003, and the Cleveland Cavaliers from 2003 to 2005. He also served as an advance scout for the Washington Wizards during the 2005–06 season, and as an assistant coach for the Golden State Warriors from 2006 to 2010, before leaving to rejoin his father in Charlotte where he worked from 2010 until 2018.

At the time of his hiring as an assistant with the Hornets on June 5, 2000, he was the youngest assistant in the NBA at the age of 27.

Early career
Silas was born in Boston, and grew up in Boston and New York City. He graduated from Brown University in 1996 with bachelor's degrees in sociology and management. While studying, he played four seasons for the university's basketball team. After graduation and before joining the NBA, Silas spent three years as the assistant executive director of the National Basketball Retired Players Association (NBRPA) in Providence, Rhode Island.

Coaching career
Silas assisted the Hornets to the playoffs in the 2013–14 and 2015–16 seasons and during the 2013–14 season, the Hornets finished with the second highest number of single season wins in franchise history (43). During the 2011–12 season, on several occasions Silas served as the head coach for the Charlotte Bobcats.

Prior to joining the Bobcats, Silas spent more than five years coaching with the Golden State Warriors. He has been an NBA assistant coach and scout for more than 10 years. He did not only work with his father, but also worked for legendary Hall of Fame coach Don Nelson. With the Warriors, Silas concentrated on the development of perimeter players as well as game preparation and managing the team's offensive and defensive playbook. One of these perimeter players included the two-time MVP Stephen Curry. He also served as the head coach for the Warriors' Summer League entry in Las Vegas.

Prior to joining the Warriors, Silas served as an advance scout for the Washington Wizards during the 2005–06 season after spending five seasons on the coaching staffs of his father, Paul Silas, with the Cleveland Cavaliers and both Hornets' franchises. Silas served as an assistant coach for the Cavaliers from 2003 to 2005, where he worked closely with LeBron James and was responsible for individual skill work, player development, game preparation, pre-game walkthroughs as well as the management and development of the technology and NBA scouting systems for the coaching staff. Silas also served as head coach for the Cavaliers 2003 Summer League teams in Boston and Orlando.

Silas also spent three seasons as an assistant coach with the Charlotte Hornets prior to joining the Cavaliers. Silas originally joined the Hornets in the summer of 1999 as an advance and college scout, scouting nearly 200 NBA and college games in that role. He also served as the head coach for the Hornets Summer League squad at the 2002 Orlando Summer Pro League. In addition to his work with NBA teams, Silas coached at the 2003 and 2007 NBA Pre-Draft camps.

In 2010, he joined the Charlotte Bobcats after his father became interim head coach of the team. At the end of the 2015–16 season, Silas emerged as a leading candidate to fill the head coaching position for the Houston Rockets.

On December 4, 2017, Silas filled in as head coach of the Hornets when Steve Clifford became ill, and continued to do so until Clifford returned on January 16, 2018.

On May 24, 2018, Silas joined the Dallas Mavericks as an assistant coach.

Houston Rockets (2020–present)

On October 30, 2020, Silas was named the head coach for the Houston Rockets, this marked Silas first time getting the job of a head coach. Silas and the Rockets started out the 2020–21 season with a 11–10 record, but when Rockets forward Christian Wood injured his right knee in a win against the Memphis Grizzlies on February 4, 2021, Silas and his Rockets started to struggle, going on a 20 game losing streak. Unfortunately for Silas and the Rockets, in his first season, they had to play a league-record 30 players due to various injuries and trades, even playing with only seven or eight players for some games near the end of the season, and they finished with a league-worst 17–55 record. In the following 2021–22 season, Silas and the Rockets were once again at the bottom of the Western Conference, finishing with a 20–62 record.

International coaching
Internationally, Silas has worked at many camps and clinics across the globe to help promote the game of basketball and the NBA. Recently, he served as coach at the Korea Development Camp in Seoul, working in conjunction with the NBA and Korean Basketball League. In 2008, he served as a coach at the NBA's Basketball Without Borders camp in Africa, as well as in Beijing during the summer of 2005. And in 2004, he represented the NBA Coaches Association at the Dirk Nowitzki Basketball Academy in Berlin, Germany.

Head coaching record

|-
| style="text-align:left;"|Houston
| style="text-align:left;"|
| 72||17||55|||| style="text-align:center;"|5th in Southwest||—||—||—||—
| style="text-align:center;"|Missed playoffs
|-
| style="text-align:left;"|Houston
| style="text-align:left;"|
| 82||20||62|||| style="text-align:center;"|5th in Southwest||—||—||—||—
| style="text-align:center;"|Missed playoffs
|- class="sortbottom"
| style="text-align:center;" colspan="2"|Career
| 154||37||117|||| ||—||—||—||—||

Personal life
Stephen and his wife, Keryl, are the parents of two young daughters.

References

External links
NBA.com – Stephen Silas
College playing statistics

1973 births
Living people
American men's basketball coaches
American men's basketball players
Basketball coaches from Massachusetts
Brown Bears men's basketball players
Charlotte Bobcats assistant coaches
Charlotte Hornets assistant coaches
Cleveland Cavaliers assistant coaches
Dallas Mavericks assistant coaches
Golden State Warriors assistant coaches
Guards (basketball)
Houston Rockets head coaches
New Orleans Hornets assistant coaches
Sportspeople from Boston